Matam is a region of Senegal (regional capitals have the same name as their respective regions).

It is a stark, flat, arid place bounded on the north by the Sénégal River and the south by the Sahelian plain studded with baobab trees.  Matam is populated by the tall Pulaar-speaking Toucouleur people who brought Islam to Senegal in the 11th century and gave us the music of Baaba Maal in the 21st century.

Departments
Matam region is divided into 3 departments:
 Kanel Département
 Matam Département
 Ranérou Ferlo Département

Geography
Matam is traversed by the northwesterly line of equal latitude and longitude.

Cities and Villages
 Agnam-Goly
 Agnam Civol
 Bokidiawé
 Dabia
 Kanel
 Matam
 Nabadji Civol
 
 Oréfondé
 Orkadiére
 Ourossogui
 Ranérou
 Semme
 
 Thilogne
 Vélingara
 Waoundé
 Diandioly
 Shinthiou Garba
 Fadiara
 Bokiladji
 Hadoubere
 Dembankane
 Yerimale
 Hamady Ounare
 Soringho
 Sinthiane

See also
 Matam

External links
The energy to stay: Senegal's village of women (Al Jazeera, July 2020)

 
Regions of Senegal